Invertible may refer to

Mathematics
Invertible element
Invertible function
Invertible ideal
Invertible knot
Invertible jet
Invertible matrix
Invertible module
Invertible sheaf

Others
Invertible counterpoint

See also
Inverse (disambiguation)